Steve Cohen is an American author, publishing entrepreneur, and attorney.  His articles, mostly opinion pieces, appear regularly in Forbes, The New York Times, The Wall Street Journal, City Journal Time, and more.  He is the author or co-author of six books, including three best-sellers.  His early career included stints at Time and Scholastic before becoming an entrepreneur.  He co-chaired the Clinton White House literacy task force "Prescription for Reading Partnership," and served on the Boards of Reach Out and Read and the United States Naval Institute. At age 58 he went to law school, and is currently an attorney in New York City.

Early life and education
Steve grew up in Lynbrook, New York and was appointed to the United States Naval Academy in Annapolis by Congressman Allard Lowenstein.  Steve attended the Academy for nearly three years, then transferred to Brown University under the G.I. Bill. He graduated in 1975, with a concentration in Public Policy. He was a class marshal, a Rhodes Scholarship state finalist, and was one of two student representatives to the University's Board of Trustees. In 2013, he graduated from New York Law School, and is admitted to practice in New York.

Career
Early in his career, Steve worked for the Governor of Rhode Island, for the New York State Senate, and for several advertising agencies.  He was also on Ronald Reagan's national campaign staff in the 1980 Presidential race, where he wrote and produced television commercials and print ads. "Podium" and "No More" were ads made for the 1980 Reagan campaign. His "Flip-flop" and "Surprised" commercials are in the Museum of the Moving Image collection of classic political advertising. 
For nearly seven years Steve worked for Time Inc. where he held marketing positions, and created and produced the Time Man of the Year television documentaries.  With James Rich he created  "Covermaker," one of the first widely-used educational computer software programs; and he was creator and publisher of the Time College Achievement Awards.

Steve spent two years as a vice president with Playboy, and won two Clio Awards for best radio and television advertising campaigns.  His invitation to CNBC to bring television cameras into the Playboy offices as a half-dozen top advertising agencies competed for the Playboy account resulted in an insightful half-hour documentary on business decision-making.

For nine years Steve was then a Managing Director at Scholastic, the children's publishing company.  He was responsible for creating and managing several businesses including Parent & Child Magazine, the Parent Bookshelf, and the Everything You Always Wanted to Know About....(Kindergarten, First Grade, Second Grade) book series.  At Scholastic, he started the print-on-demand, multi-lingual book series he created for the Reach Out and Read literacy project.

Steve left Scholastic to become CEO of several internet start-ups including 4-to-14/Brainquest.com; Living Independently/Quietcare (sold to General Electric;) and MultiMedicus/The Child Health Guide – developed in cooperation with Harvard and Dartmouth Medical Schools.

Since 1983, Steve has been an adjunct professor and NYU and Fordham, as well as a guest lecturer at his alma mater, Brown and various other schools, including Dartmouth, Columbia, Stanford and many of the SUNY schools.

As a Contributing Author
Beginning in 1976, Steve began writing articles for magazines and Newspapers.  He has written – most on issues of public policy – for The New York Times, The Wall Street Journal, The New York Sun, The New York Observer, Forbes, Bloomberg View, The Daily Beast, City Journal, The Naval Institute Proceedings, Inside Higher Education, The Chronicle of Higher Education, The Brown Alumni Magazine, and Mademoiselle – among others.  He's apparently the first person to have had two different Op-Ed articles in The New York Times and The Wall Street Journal on the same day.  (March 20, 2014.)

Books
He has written or co-authored six books: 
Getting In!—with Paulo DeOliveira (Workman 1983) 
Getting to the Right Job – with Paulo DeOliveira (Workman 1987) 
Learn to Read Treasure Hunts – (Workman 1997) 
Parents Guide to the Best Family Videos – with Patty McCormick (St. Martins 1999) 
Next Stop Hollywood – (St. Martins 2007) 
Getting In – the Zinch Guide to Admissions and Financial Aid in the Digital Age – with Michael Muska, Paulo DeOliveira, and Anne Dwane (Wiley 2011)

Personal life
Steve and his wife Sarah Hill live in Manhattan.  They have two grown sons.

References

Living people
People from Lynbrook, New York
American writers
American lawyers
New York Law School alumni
United States Naval Academy alumni
Brown University alumni
Year of birth missing (living people)